Claudio Ernesto González Muñoz (born March 21, 1992, in Irapuato, Guanajuato) is a former Mexican professional footballer who last played for León.

References

1992 births
Living people
Mexican footballers
Association football forwards
Atlético ECCA footballers
Atlante F.C. footballers
Santos de Soledad players
Club León footballers
Correcaminos UAT footballers
Liga MX players
Ascenso MX players
Liga Premier de México players
Tercera División de México players
Footballers from Guanajuato
People from Irapuato